In algebraic topology, a fiber-homotopy equivalence is a map over a space B that has homotopy inverse over B (that is we require a homotopy be a map over B for each time t.) It is a relative analog of a homotopy equivalence between spaces.

Given maps p: D → B, q: E → B, if ƒ: D → E is a fiber-homotopy equivalence, then for any b in B the restriction

is a homotopy equivalence. If p, q are fibrations, this is always the case for homotopy equivalences by the next proposition.

Proof of the proposition 
We write  for a homotopy over B.

We first note that it is enough to show that ƒ admits a left homotopy inverse over B. Indeed, if  with g over B, then g is in particular a homotopy equivalence. Thus, g also admits a left homotopy inverse h over B and then formally we have ; that is, .

Now, since ƒ is a homotopy equivalence, it has a homotopy inverse g. Since , we have: . Since p is a fibration, the homotopy  lifts to a homotopy from g to, say, g' that satisfies . Thus, we can assume g is over B. Then it suffices to show gƒ, which is now over B, has a left homotopy inverse over B since that would imply that ƒ has such a left inverse.

Then, since  and since p is a fibration, the homotopy  lifts to a homotopy ; explicitly, we have . Note also  is over B.

We show  is a left homotopy inverse of ƒ over B. Let  be the homotopy given as the composition of homotopies . Then we can find a homotopy K from the homotopy pJ to the constant homotopy . Since p is a fibration, we can lift K to, say, L. We can finish by going around the edge corresponding to J:

References 
 

Algebraic topology
Homotopy theory